The 2005 European Seniors Tour was the 14th season of the European Seniors Tour, the professional golf tour for men aged 50 and above operated by the PGA European Tour.

Tournament results
The numbers in brackets after the winners' names show the number of career wins they had on the European Seniors Tour up to and including that event. This is only shown for players who are members of the tour.

For the tour schedule on the European Senior Tour's website, including links to full results, click here.

Leading money winners

There is a complete list on the official site here.

External links

European Senior Tour
European Senior Tour